The Museum of Everyday Culture is a museum of cultural history in Waldenbuch, a town close by Stuttgart, Germany. It is a branch of the Landesmuseum Württemberg and one of the most important museums of folk culture in Germany.

History and concept 
The Museum of Everyday Culture exists as an independent institution since 1989/90. The folkloric collection of the Landesmuseum Württemberg can be traced back to the former Landesgewerbemuseum in Stuttgart which was founded in the 19th century.

Collection 
The museum's collection covers a wide range of different topics and different ages – from traditional folk art to modern pop culture. Main topics include believe and superstition, clothing, advertisement, folk- and amateur-art. Regional emphasis lies on the area of Württemberg. The museum's collection mirrors the changes from pre-industrial to industrial and post-industrial times.

Permanent Exhibition 
The exhibition area in Castle Waldenbuch comprises 2500m² on three floors. From 2010 until 2015 the complete exhibition will step for step undergo a renewal.

Time-hopping (ZeitSprünge) 

Opened in 2011, this part of the exhibition is of the museum's highlights. In “ZeitSprünge” a historical object of everyday-usage is contrasted with a modern one. Put together under one generic term the seemingly different objects suddenly display unexpected commonalities.

Realms of living/How we live (Wohnwelten) 
The “Wohnwelten” are so far the newest part of the museum. It is both a documentary and an analysis of how people have been living since the 18th century. It shows developments and changes of interior spaces.

Deers, princes, stories of the woods (Hirsche, Fürsten, Waldgeschichten) 
This part of the exhibition is concerned with the history of Castle Waldenbuch until the 19th century when the castle was used as hunting-residence by the duke and stood as the centre of hunting in Württemberg. Magnificent deer's antlers, rifles, hunting-equipment and other, partly curious hunting-supplies are displayed in the exhibition.

Life is work (Leben ist Arbeit) 
Located on the ground floor, this part covers the topics of agriculture and early industrialization in Württemberg: from wooden plows and weaving looms to the production of cuckoo clocks in the black forest.

My Piece of Everyday Life (Mein Stück Alltag) 

“Mein Stück Alltag” is an exhibition of the visitors: they can hand in objects they use or used in their everyday life. These are then displayed in small glass-cabinets together with the donor's personal relation to the object and a short note from the curator in charge.

External links 
 Official site
 Landesmuseum Württemberg (State Museum of Württemberg)

Folk art museums and galleries
Folk museums in Germany
Museums in Baden-Württemberg